Salim Bullen (born March 16, 1984) is a former American soccer player.

Career
Bullen spent his college career at Bradley University where he made a total of 65 appearances and tallied three goals and nine assists.  He also spent time with the Fort Wayne Fever in the USL Premier Development League.

In 2006, Bullen joined USL-1 club Portland Timbers where he played alongside his cousin Oral.  He made 11 appearances for the Timbers in 2006.

References

External links
 Bradley Braves bio

1984 births
Living people
American soccer players
Bradley Braves men's soccer players
Fort Wayne Fever players
Portland Timbers (2001–2010) players
Association football midfielders
Soccer players from New York (state)
USL League Two players
USL First Division players